is a Japanese former professional tennis player.

She has won one singles title on the WTA Tour, as well as seven singles and three doubles titles on the ITF Women's Circuit. On 18 August 2014, she reached a career-high singles ranking of world No. 32. On 2 May 2016, she peaked at No. 109 in the WTA doubles rankings.

Playing for Japan Fed Cup team, Nara has a win–loss record of 12–8.

Junior career
Nara began playing tennis at the age of three. At the Esaka Tennis Center in Osaka, the budding pro player studied tennis under the tutelage of Japanese tennis luminaries Masaru Suishu and Hiroko Mochizuki. She won recognition from an early age as a tennis prodigy. In 2002, while enrolled in Kawanishi Makinodai Elementary School, Nara took second place in the All Japan Primary School Tennis Championships at the age of ten. She would go on to win that tournament in 2003.

In 2004, after entering the middle school associated with Osaka Sangyo University, Nara won the girls' singles title in the All Japan Middle School Tennis Championship. 2006 marked her debut, via sponsor recommendation, in the All Japan Tennis Championships women's singles draw; however, a first-round loss abruptly ended her tournament run. As a freshman at Osaka Sangyo's high school in 2007, Nara won the Under-18 singles title at the All-Japan Junior Tennis Championships.

In addition to her participation in the major events for her age group, Nara also accumulated victories each year in junior events throughout Japan. She enjoyed success in doubles on the ITF Junior Circuit with partner Misaki Doi, earning entrance to the girls' doubles draw at the Wimbledon Championships in 2007. They placed second overall, becoming only the second Japanese women's doubles pair to reach the finals of a Grand Slam juniors event since Yuka Yoshida and Hiroko Mochizuki at the 1993 US Open. The Nara/Doi team went on to reach the junior doubles semifinals at the 2007 US Open and 2008 Wimbledon Championships, in addition to strong performances at smaller tournaments.

Nara also enjoyed success in singles. In 2007, she became the first Japanese woman to win the Osaka Mayor's Cup since Ryōko Fuda in 2002. Also that year, she made her second appearance, again by sponsor recommendation, in the All Japan Tennis Championships. In the second round, she defeated defending champion and fifth seed, Erika Takao, in straight sets, in the third round, she toppled 11th seed Tomoko Yonemura in three sets, and in the quarterfinals, she lost to Junri Namigata. Nara teamed again with Misaki Doi in doubles, reaching the second round in her tournament doubles debut. The next year, she partnered with Kimiko Date-Krumm to win the Kangaroo Cup in Gifu, and the title at the Hamanako Open. She reached the third round of the 2008 US Open girls' singles tournament, where she lost to Kristina Mladenovic.

Professional career

2009–10
Nara turned professional in April 2009, winning the All Japan Tennis Championships that same year. She advanced to the main draw of a Grand Slam tournament for the first time at the 2010 French Open with a three set win over Monica Niculescu in the qualifiers. At four hours and 42 minutes, it was said to be the longest women's Grand Slam qualifier or main-draw match in history. She would go on to lose her first-round match to Arantxa Parra Santonja. She also qualified for Wimbledon, and won her first Grand Slam main-draw singles match in two sets, over Mariana Duque Mariño. She fell to Li Na in the second round.

2011–13
Nara failed to gain entrance to the four Grand Slam tournaments in 2011, falling in the qualifiers each time. July marked Nara's first appearance representing Japan in Fed Cup competition; she notched a win in doubles with partner Rika Fujiwara in the playoffs against Argentina.
Although she was again unable to pass the qualifying rounds of the year's Grand Slam events, Nara bested Polona Hercog and Eleni Daniilidou to qualify for the Pan Pacific Open in Tokyo in 2012. She was defeated in the first round by Urszula Radwańska.
Nara won three qualifying matches to enter the main draw of the 2013 US Open, winning her first-round match against Alexandra Cadanțu. She advanced to the third round of a Grand Slam tournament for the first time, with a straight-set upset victory over 19th-seeded Sorana Cîrstea. She lost to Jelena Janković in the third round. After four early exits in Tashkent, Guangzhou, Tokyo and Beijing, Nara regained some form in her home city at the Japan Women's Open. She would make it to the semifinals of the tournament but was ousted by Eugenie Bouchard, losing in straight sets.

2014: First singles title, top 50 ranking

Nara started season in New Zealand at the Auckland Open. She made it to the quarterfinals where she lost to second seed and eventual champion, Ana Ivanovic. At the Australian Open, she was defeated in the third round by eighth seed Jelena Janković.

In early February, Nara competed in Fed Cup competition for Japan against Argentina in Buenos Aires. She lost the opening singles match to María Irigoyen, and also lost the reverse singles to Paula Ormaechea.

Later the same month, Nara, seeded fifth at the first edition of the Rio Open, won her first WTA Tour title beating top seeded Klára Zakopalová in the final. The win helped her break into the top 50 at No. 48.

At the Indian Wells Open, Nara was defeated in the second round by sixth seed Simona Halep. In Miami, she lost to fourth seed Maria Sharapova in the second round.

In April, she again played in Fed Cup, this time against the Netherlands. She won the opening singles match against Arantxa Rus, but was defeated by Kiki Bertens in the reverse singles match. Her next match was a disappointing first-round loss at the Portugal Open to qualifier Irina-Camelia Begu. Another first-round loss came against Peng Shuai at the Madrid Open. In a rematch from the Fed Cup, Nara again was defeated by lucky loser Paula Ormaechea in her first-round match at the Italian Open. Seeded sixth at the Nürnberger Versicherungscup, she lost in the second round to Yaroslava Shvedova. At the French Open, she was defeated in the second round by sixth seed Jelena Janković.

Nara started her grass-court season at the Birmingham Classic. For the second consecutive year, she lost to British wildcard Johanna Konta in the first round. Nara was defeated in the first round of the Rosmalen Open by Elina Svitolina. At Wimbledon, she reached the second round where she lost to 30th seed, five-time Wimbledon champion, and former world No. 1, Venus Williams.

Seeded sixth at the İstanbul Cup, Nara made it to the quarterfinals where she was defeated by second seed and eventual finalist Roberta Vinci. Seeded fourth at the Baku Cup, she fell in the first round to Francesca Schiavone.

Beginning the US Open Series at the Washington Open, Nara reached the final where she lost to sixth seed Svetlana Kuznetsova. Partnering with Hiroko Kuwata, they reached the final in doubles and were defeated by the second-seeded team of Shuko Aoyama / Gabriela Dabrowski. 

Nara was scheduled to play at the Rogers Cup but withdrew because of a hip injury. At the Cincinnati Open, Nara was eliminated in the second round by fourth seed Agnieszka Radwańska. Playing in her last tournament before the US Open, she lost in the first round at the Connecticut Open to Sam Stosur. Seeded 31st at the US Open, Nara was defeated in the second round by Belinda Bencic.

In September, she lost to eighth seed Carla Suárez Navarro in the first round of the Pan Pacific Open. Competing at the first edition of the Wuhan Open, she was defeated in the first round by Svetlana Kuznetsova. At the China Open, she made it to the second round where she was defeated again by Kuznetsova. Nara was scheduled to be the fourth seed at the Japan Women's Open but withdrew with a respiratory illness.

She ended the year ranked 44.

2015: Top 100 ranking

Nara began season in January at the Auckland Open where she fell in the second round to third seed and eventual champion Venus Williams. At the Hobart International, she reached the semifinals where she was defeated by American qualifier Madison Brengle. Nara lost in the first round of the Australian Open to sixth seed Agnieszka Radwańska.

Seeded fourth at the Thailand Open, she was defeated in the second round by Evgeniya Rodina. At the Dubai Tennis Championships, Nara lost in the first round to qualifier Wang Qiang. Seeded sixth at the Malaysian Open, she reached the quarterfinals where she was defeated by fourth seed Jarmila Gajdošová. Competing at Indian Wells, Nara was eliminated in the first round by qualifier Alison Van Uytvanck. She made it to the third round at the Miami Open where she lost to wildcard Daria Gavrilova.

In the clay-court season at the Morocco Open, she was defeated in the first round by Lara Arruabarrena. She suffered a first-round loss at the Madrid Open to Irina-Camelia Begu. Playing in Rome, she was defeated in the first round of qualifying by Daria Gavrilova. Seeded seventh at the Nürnberger Versicherungscup, Nara reached the quarterfinals where she lost to fourth seed and eventual finalist, Roberta Vinci. At the French Open, she was defeated in the second round by 13th seed and eventual finalist, Lucie Šafářová.

Nara played three grass-court tournaments before Wimbledon. At the Rosmalen Championships, she lost in the second round to seventh seed Kristina Mladenovic. Nara was defeated in her first-round match in Birmingham by Kateřina Siniaková. In Eastbourne, she lost in the final round of qualifying to Alexandra Dulgheru. At Wimbledon, she was defeated in the second round by second seed and two-time champion Petra Kvitová.

After Wimbledon, Nara played at the İstanbul Cup and lost in the second round to eighth seed Tsvetana Pironkova. Seeded fourth at the Baku Cup, she was defeated in round one by qualifier Olga Savchuk.

Nara got her US Open preparations underway at the Washington Open. After reaching the final the year before, she fell in the first round to Yulia Putintseva. In Cincinnati, she retired in her final round of qualifying against Putintseva. At the US Open, Nara upset 27th seed Alizé Cornet in the first round and lost in the second to American qualifier Shelby Rogers.

2022: Retirement
The final tournament of her career was the Pan Pacific Open in September where she competed as a qualifying wildcard and lost in the second round to Isabella Shinikova.

Playing style
Kurumi Nara rarely wins points outright. Instead, she plays a patient game and tends to edge into points, gradually increasing the angle and/or power of her shots, and prefers a punishing forehand or volley to close the point out. Her patience is also reflected in her serve, which (especially for her size) has quite a high ball toss. Her serve lacks the punch of players like Serena Williams or Maria Sharapova, but depends on placement and spin. Her short stature has definitely shaped her play style which, while aggressive, does not emphasize power, but more swinging the momentum in her favour and finishing the point off. Her strong forehand is her main weapon.

Equipment
Nara who prefers to play on hardcourts, uses a Srixon racquet and Dunlop Sport shoes.

Performance timelines

Only main-draw results in WTA Tour, Grand Slam tournaments, Fed Cup/Billie Jean King Cup and Olympic Games are included in win–loss records.

Singles
Current after the 2022 Australian Open.

Doubles

Notes

WTA career finals

Singles: 2 (1 title, 1 runner-up)

Doubles: 2 (2 runner-ups)

ITF Circuit finals

Singles: 13 (7 titles, 6 runner–ups)

Doubles: 7 (3 titles, 4 runner–ups)

Wins over top-10 players per season

Notes

References

External links

 
 
 

1991 births
Living people
Japanese female tennis players
Sportspeople from Hyōgo Prefecture
Sportspeople from Osaka Prefecture
21st-century Japanese women